Morris State Park is a public recreation area consisting of  in Dunklin County, Missouri. The state park preserves a section of Crowley's Ridge, a unique geologic feature of southeast Missouri and northeast Arkansas. The state park offers a two-mile hiking trail along a portion of the "geologic oddity." The park is named for businessman Jim D. Morris, who donated the parcel to the state in 1999.

References

External links
Morris State Park Missouri Department of Natural Resources 
Morris State Park Map Missouri Department of Natural Resources

State parks of Missouri
Crowley's Ridge
Protected areas of Dunklin County, Missouri
Protected areas established in 2000
2000 establishments in Missouri